Chatterjee or Chattopadhyay (চট্টোপাধ্যায়) is a Bengali Hindu family name, used primarily by the Kulin group of Pancha-Gauda Brahmins in India, and associated with the Bengali Brahmin caste. Chatterjee is an Anglicized variant of the Sanskritized Chattopadhyay. English language spellings include Chatterjee, Chatterjea, Chatarji, Chatterji, Chaterjee, Chattopadhyay, and Chattopadhyaya. Together with Banerjees, Mukherjees, and Gangulys, Chatterjees form the Kulin Brahmins, the highest tier of the Bengali caste system. They belong to Rarhi clan and the Kashyapa gotra.

Notable Chatterjees 
  
 Abhishek Chatterjee  Bengali film and television actor
 Abir Chatterjee – actor
 Adhar Kumar Chatterji – former Chief of the Naval Staff of the Indian Navy (1966–1970)
 Amarendranath Chatterjee – freedom fighter
 Amitabha Chattopadhyay – biophysicist
 Amitava Chattopadhyay – INSEAD professor of marketing and innovation
 Angana P. Chatterji – anthropologist, activist and feminist historian
 Anil Chatterjee – actor
 Anindo Chatterjee – tabla player
 Anjan Chattopadhyay – sitar maestro
 Anjan Chatterjee (neuroscientist) – cognitive neuroscientist
 Aroup Chatterjee – British Indian atheist, physician, author of Mother Teresa: The Untold Story
 Ashim Chatterjee – politician and activist
 Asima Chatterjee – Indian organic chemist and the second woman to be conferred a Doctorate of Science by an Indian university
 Atul Chandra Chatterjee – Indian diplomat and government official. Served as the Indian High Commissioner to the United Kingdom from 1925 to 1931.
 Bamacharan Chattopadhyay – ardent devotee of Maa Tara, also considered to be an avatar of Lord Shiva
 Bankim Chandra Chatterjee – Indian patriot, writer, poet and journalist and composer of Vande Mataram, the national song of India
 Basu Chatterjee – film director
 Bhaswar Chatterjee – Indian actor
 Biswajit Chatterjee – Bollywood actor
 Debabarta Chatterjee – botanist
 Debiprasad Chattopadhyaya – author, philosopher
 Debjani Chatterji – Indian-born British poet
 Dhritiman Chatterjee – actor 
 Dhruva Chatterjee – writer and screenplay writer of Hindi movies
 Dipankar Chatterji – molecular biologist
 Gadadhar Chattopadhyay – Sri Sri Ramakrishna Paramahansa, devotee of Dakshina Kali and Priest of Dakshineswar Kali Temple.
 Gautam Chattopadhyay – musician
 Harindranath Chattopadhyay – poet, actor and brother of Sarojini Naidu
 Indira Chatterji (born 1973), Swiss-Indian mathematician
 Jogesh Chandra Chatterjee – Indian freedom fighter, activist and member of Rajya Sabha
 Joya Chatterji – Professor of South Asian history
 Kamaladevi Chattopadhyay – social reformer
 Kshetresa Chandra Chattopadhyaya – Sanskrit scholar
 Mirai Chatterjee – Indian social worker
 Moushumi Chatterjee – Bollywood actress
 Neil Chatterjee – American lawyer, political advisor, and government official, chair of the Federal Energy Regulatory Commission twice between 2017 and 2020
 Nigamananda – Yogi
 Parambrata Chatterjee – actor
 Partha Chatterjee – scholar and author
 Piya Chattopadhyay – Canadian broadcaster
 Pratap Chatterjee – journalist and author
 Priyadarshini Chatterjee – Miss India World 2016
 Priyanshu Chatterjee – Bollywood actor
 Prosenjit Chatterjee – actor
 Pulok Chatterji – former bureaucrat and Principal Secretary to the Prime Minister of India (2011–2014)
 Purnendu Chatterjee – businessman, founder of TCG
 Rabiranjan Chattopadhyay, Indian politician
 Ramakrishna Paramahamsa – born Gadadhar Chattopadhyay, a famous mystic of 19th-century India
 Ramananda Chatterjee — founder, editor, and owner of the Modern Review, he has been described as the father of Indian journalism
 Rangan Chatterjee – Physician, author, television presenter and broadcaster
 Sabitri Chatterjee – Indian Bengali female actress
 Sankar Chatterjee – paleontologist
 Sarat Chandra Chattopadhyay, Indian writer
 Sarojini Naidu née Chattopadhyay – freedom fighter, poet
 Saswata Chatterjee – actor
 Shakti Chattopadhyay – poet
 Shekhar Chatterjee – entrepreneur
 Shiba P. Chatterjee – professor, former president of International Geographical Union
 Sitaramdas Omkarnath – Bhakti saint
 Somnath Chatterjee – eminent lawyer and former speaker of Lok Sabha
 Soumitra Chatterjee – actor
 Sourav Chatterjee – mathematician
 Sovan Chatterjee – former mayor of the city of Kolkata
 Srabanti Chatterjee – actress
 Subhendu Chatterjee – actor
 Subhadeep Chatterjee – Indian molecular biologist
 Sudeep Chatterjee – cinematographer
 Sudip Chattopadhyay – biologist
 Suman Chatterjee (now Kabir Suman) – musician
 Suniti Kumar Chatterji – Indian linguist, educationist and litterateur
 Swapan Chattopadhyay – director of the Cockcroft Institute
 Tannishtha Chatterjee – actress
 Upamanyu Chatterjee – author
 Utpal Chatterjee – cricketer
 Uttam Kumar (Arun Chatterjee) – actor
 Vikram Chatterjee – Indian actor of Bengali cinema
 Virendranath Chattopadhyaya – activist

See also 
 Bengali Hindus
 Bengali Brahmins
 Kulin Brahmins

References 

Brahmin communities
Social groups of West Bengal
Indian surnames
Bengali-language surnames
Hindu surnames
Bengali Hindu surnames
Kulin Brahmin surnames